Stockholm Marathon is a 1994 film directed by Peter Keglevic about the Swedish police detective Martin Beck, loosely based on the last Martin Beck novel, The Terrorists (1975). The title song for the film, "Marathon of Life", was written by Ralf Stemmann and performed by Thomas Anders (of Modern Talking).

Cast
Gösta Ekman as Martin Beck
Kjell Bergqvist as Lennart Kollberg
Rolf Lassgård as Gunvald Larsson
Niklas Hjulström as Benny Skacke
Thomas Anders as Ypsilon

References

Further reading
Maj Sjöwall and Per Wahlöö (1975), trans. Joan Tate, The Terrorists, 1978 reprint, New York:  Vintage, .

External links

German mystery drama films
Swedish mystery drama films
Martin Beck films
1994 crime films
1990s Swedish films
1990s German films